Blaine Lee Pardoe is an bestselling and award winning American author and military historian, known primarily for writing the Battletech and MechWarrior: Dark Age series of science fiction books, business management books, military history, and true crime works.

Early life 
Pardoe was born in Newport News, Virginia in 1962 and was raised in Battle Creek, Michigan. He attended Central Michigan University  where he wrote for CM Life, the schools newspaper. After graduating with a bachelor's degree in business management, he worked for Michigan auto companies Ford, GM, and Chrysler. He began writing for scifi game and reference books and moved back to Virginia.

Career 
He has been a regular contributor to American Thinker, PJ Media, American Greatness, Bizpac Review, and other conservative sites.

Pardoe designed the Domination role-playing game, which was published by StarChilde Publications in 1989 and was once a writer for Battletechs fiction. His best known book in the MechWarrior Dark Ages line was Surrender Your Dreams. His book, "Hour of the Wolf," remains Catalyst's bestselling BattleTech novel.  He contributed stories to on-line pay-to-read fiction website, Battlecorps. 

In 2008 his book on Frank Luke Jr., Terror of the Autumn Skies, was released (Skyhorse Publishing, 2008). His most recent BattleTech novel is No Substitute for Victory. His most recent political thriller is A Most Uncivil War.

Pardoe has been a guest speaker at the U.S. National Archives, the U.S. Navy Museum, the Smithsonian, the Mariner's Museum, and the New York Military Affairs Symposium. won the Historical Society of Michigan's State History Award in 2011 and the Silver Medal from the Military Writer's Society of America the same year for his book Lost Eagles (University of Michigan Press) about Frederick Zinn of the Lafayette Flying Corps. His books have appeared on several bestseller lists both including the New York Times Murder and Mayhem list in October 2014 and on Amazon.com and in numerous newspapers.

On July 30, 2022, Catalyst Game Labs announced that they were protecting their company's reputation by suspending publication of new works by Pardoe “primarily due to Mr. Pardoe’s online activities which do not align with Catalyst’s publishing vision.”  Pardoe has claimed in an article that the decision was the result of a "smear campaign".

Pardoe lives in Spotsylvania, Virginia.

 Bibliography Political Thrillers: Blue Dawn (2021)
 A Most Uncivil War (2022)Political Humor: The Democratic Party Playbook (2022)True Crime: Secret Witness (2012) 
 Murder in Battle Creek:  The Sensational Murder of Daisy Zick (2013)
 The Murder of Maggie Hume - Cold Case in Battle Creek (2014)
 Sawney Bean - Dissecting the Legend of the Scottish Cannibal (2015)
 The Original Battle Creek Crime King:  Adam "Pump" Arnold's Vile Reign (2016)
 A Special Kind of Evil - The Colonial Parkway Murders (2017)
 Tantamount - The Pursuit of the Freeway Phantom Serial Killer (2019)Military History (non-fiction): The Cruise of the Sea Eagle (2005)
 Terror of the Autumn Skies (2008)
 Lost Eagles (2010)
 The Bad Boy:  Bert Hall Aviator and Mercenary of the Skies (2012)
 The Fires of October, The Cuban Missile Crisis that Never Was-The Invasion of Cuba and World War III (2013)
 Never Wars - The US Plans to Invade the World (2015)Novels:'

 Highlander Gambit (1995)
 Star Lord - Contributed (1995)
 Impetus of War (1996)
 Exodus Road (1996)
 Roar of Honor (1999)
 By Blood Betrayed - Co-authored (1999)
 Measure of a Hero (2000)
 The Call of Duty (2001)
 Operation Audacity (2002)
 Target of Opportunity (2005)
 Surrender Your Dreams (MechWarrior) (2006)
 Fire at Will (MechWarrior) (2007)
 Betrayal of Ideals (BattleTech) (2016)
 The Anvil (2018)
 Forever Faithful(2019)
 Divided We Fall  (2019)
 Rock of the Republic (2020)
 Hour of the Wolf (2020)
 Proliferation Cycle (2020)
 Leviathans - Armored Skies (2020)
 Tukayyid Anthology (2020)
 No Substitute For Victory (2021)

References

External links
 Author's Website
 BattleCorps.com

 'Blue Dawn' Amazon Page

Living people
American science fiction writers
American military historians
Role-playing game designers
People from Rappahannock County, Virginia
Novelists from Virginia
American male novelists
American male non-fiction writers
Role-playing game writers
Historians from Virginia
1962 births